Morgan James Homestead is a historic home located at New Britain Township, Bucks County, Pennsylvania. The original Federal period house was built about 1783, and consists of a two-story, fieldstone main house with a one-story rear addition.  The rear addition contains a kitchen and smokehouse.  A three-story, stuccoed stone addition with a gable roof was built about 1840.  Also on the property is a large Pennsylvania bank barn.

It was added to the National Register of Historic Places in 1977.

References

Houses on the National Register of Historic Places in Pennsylvania
Federal architecture in Pennsylvania
Houses completed in 1840
Houses in Bucks County, Pennsylvania
National Register of Historic Places in Bucks County, Pennsylvania